Dominador Rosauro Aytona (23 May 1918 – 26 September 2017) was a Filipino politician and lawyer.

Aytona was a native of Libon, Albay, born to Jose Ataviado Aytona and Vivencia Cerdon Rosauro. He attended the Albay Training Department and the Albay Normal School and worked as a teacher before earning a bachelor's degree in business administration from the University of Manila in 1947. He earned an LL.B and LL.M from UM in 1949 and 1951 respectively. Aytona began working for the Senate of the Philippines as a financial adviser in 1950. In 1954, he became Commissioner of the Budget under president Ramon Magsaysay. Magsaysay's successor Carlos P. Garcia named Aytona Secretary of Finance in 1960. After stepping down from that post in 1961, Aytona served in the Senate of the Philippines between 1965 and 1971.

References

1918 births
2017 deaths
20th-century Filipino lawyers
Senators of the 5th Congress of the Philippines
Senators of the 6th Congress of the Philippines
Senators of the 7th Congress of the Philippines
Politicians from Albay
Nacionalista Party politicians
University of Manila alumni
Secretaries of Finance of the Philippines
Garcia administration cabinet members